The EU Intelligence and Situation Centre (EU INTCEN) is a "civilian intelligence function" of the European Union (EU). Structurally, it is a directorate of the External Action Service (EEAS) and reports directly to the EU's High Representative for Foreign Affairs and Security Policy. Article 4 of the Treaty on European Union, among other things, expressly states that "national security remains the sole responsibility of each Member State". EU INTCEN's analytical products are based on intelligence from the EU Member States' intelligence and security services.

History 
The EU INTCEN has its roots in the European Security and Defence Policy in what was then called the Joint Situation Centre. In the wake of the terrorist attacks on New York and Washington of 11 September 2001, decided to use the existing Joint Situation Centre to start producing intelligence based classified assessments.

In 2002, the Joint Situation Centre started to be a forum for exchange of sensitive information between the external intelligence services of France, Germany, Italy, the Netherlands, Spain, Sweden and the United Kingdom. At that time, the centre's mission was:

 Contribute to early warning (in conjunction with other Council military staff) through open source material, military and nonmilitary intelligence and diplomatic reporting;
 Conduct situation monitoring and assessment;
 Provide facilities for crisis task force; and
 To provide an operational point of contact for the High Representative.

At the request of High Representative Javier Solana, the Council of the European Union agreed in June 2004 to establish within SITCEN a Counter Terrorist Cell. This Cell was tasked to produce Counter Terrorist intelligence analyses with the support of Member States' Security Services.

Since 2005, the SITCEN generally used the name EU Situation Centre. In 2012, it was officially renamed European Union Intelligence Analysis Centre (EU INTCEN). It assumed its current name in 2015.

Since January 2011, the EU INTCEN is part of the European External Action Service (EEAS) under the authority of the EU's High Representative.

Directors 

 William Shapcott, a former British diplomat (2001–2010).
 , previously the Head of the Finnish Security Intelligence Service (2011–    2015)
 Gerhard Conrad, former Head of Foreign Intelligence Section of the BND (2015–2019).
 José Casimiro Morgado, previously Director-General of Portugal's Serviço de Informações Estratégicas de Defesa (2019–present).

Organisation 
, the EU INTCEN is composed of three Divisions:

 Intelligence Analysis and Reporting Branch. It is responsible for providing strategic analysis based on input from the security and intelligence services of the Member States. It is composed of various sections, dealing with geographical and thematic topics.
 Intelligence Support Branch.
 Intelligence Policy Branch.

The total number of EU INTCEN staff in 2012 and 2013 was close to 70.

Single Intelligence Analysis Capacity 

Since 2007, the EU INTCEN is part of the Single Intelligence Analysis Capacity (SIAC), which combines civilian intelligence (EU INTCEN) and military intelligence (EUMS Intelligence Directorate). In the framework of the SIAC, both civilian and military contributions are used to produce all-source intelligence assessments.

The EU INTCEN and the EUMS Intelligence Directorate are the main clients of the European Union Satellite Centre, which provides satellite imagery and analysis.

See also 
 European Centre of Excellence for Countering Hybrid Threats
Joint European Union Intelligence School
Intelligence Directorate of the European Union Military Staff

References

External links 
 
 
 

Intelligence analysis agencies
Intelligence and Situation Centre
Common Security and Defence Policy bodies of the European External Action Service